Vladimir Félix (born December 1, 1978), known professionally as DJ Blass, is a Puerto Rican record producer. He has worked with renowned reggaeton artists such as Daddy Yankee, Nicky Jam, Plan B and Wisin & Yandel.

Awards and nominations

Discography

Albums

Studio albums

Compilation albums

Notes

References

1978 births
Living people
People from Guayama, Puerto Rico
Puerto Rican record producers
Reggaeton record producers